The May Street Project is the debut album by singer-songwriter Shea Seger.  It was released in the United Kingdom on October 30, 2000, and in the United States on June 5, 2001.

Track listing 
 "Last Time" (Shea Seger, Nick Whitecross, Martin Terefe) – 3:55
 "Clutch" (Shea Seger, Kenna Zmedkun) – 3:54
 "Blind Situation" (featuring D.R.U.G.S.) (Shea Seger, Nick Whitecross, Pharrell Williams) – 4:15
 "Shatterwall" (Shea Seger, Nick Whitecross, Martin Terefe) – 3:13
 "Interlude: Roof Top Animals" (Shea Seger, Nick Whitecross) – 0:36
 "I Love You Too Much" (Shea Seger, Nick Whitecross, Martin Terefe) – 3:21
 "Walk on Rainbows" (Shea Seger, Nick Whitecross, Martin Terefe) – 3:17
 "Always" (featuring Ron Sexsmith) (Martin Terefe, Nick Whitecross) – 3:14
 "Twisted (Never Again)"  (Shea Seger, Martin Terefe, Nick Whitecross) – 3:26
 "Wasting the Rain" (Michael Ruff) – 3:15
 "Isn't It Good" (Shea Seger, Nick Whitecross, Martin Terefe) – 4:07
 "I Can't Lie" (Shea Seger, Martin Terefe, Nick Whitecross) – 2:48
 "May Street" (Shea Seger, Nick Whitecross) – 3:09

Release history

UK singles 
 "Last Time" (October 2, 2000)
 "Clutch" (April 23, 2001)
 "I Love You Too Much" (September 24, 2001)

References

External links 
 

Shea Seger albums
2000 debut albums